Turkey illusion is a cognitive bias, which was first introduced by Bertrand Russell. It describes the surprise through trend breaks, if one does not know the causes or the framework conditions for this trend. Relevant disciplines for this term are psychology and behavioral economics.

The story 

The turkey designated for Thanksgiving is fed and cared for every day until it is slaughtered. With each feeding, its certainty or confidence that nothing will happen to it increases, based on past experience. From the turkey's point of view, the certainty that it will be fed and cared for again the next day is greatest on the night before it dies, of all days. Nevertheless, it is slaughtered that day, by the very person who cared for him.

Interpretation 

The slaughter comes as a complete surprise to the turkey, who - in anthropomorphic formulation - "only extrapolates a trend" and "does not recognize the impending trend break". To recognize this trend break, the turkey would have had to find out the causes of the trend. By doing so, it would have known about the motivational state of the human who feeds it every day. In order to think outside the box and leave known or familiar thought patterns, creativity and the ability to change perspectives are necessary. But this was not possible for the turkey due to insufficient information. Despite the name, the turkey illusion is supposed to be more common among people than among turkeys.

References

Cognitive biases
Illusions
Behavioral economics